Abdul Rajab Mteketa (born 1 January 1951) is a Tanzanian CCM politician and Member of Parliament for Kilombero constituency since 2010.

References

1951 births
Living people
Tanzanian Muslims
Chama Cha Mapinduzi MPs
Tanzanian MPs 2010–2015